The Specialized Unit for Special Tactics (Slovenian: Posebna Enota za Specialno Taktiko (PEST; eng. "FIST")) is a special forces unit of the Slovenian Military Police.

PEST is a military and special forces component of the Special Military Police Unit (SMPU) of Slovenian Armed Forces. This is a small platoon-sized unit, trained and equipped for special operations such as: Counter-Terrorism, Combat Search and Rescue, Maritime Opposed and Unopposed Boarding Operations, Deep Reconnaissance, Direct Action, Sabotage, Unconventional Warfare, etc.

Common weaponry

The unit is trained and equipped according to United States specifications for SWAT Special Weapons and Tactics Unit.

Beretta M92 handgun
H&K SFP9-SD handgun
SIG Sauer P226 handgun
H&K MP5 submachine gun
FN F2000 assault rifle
Zastava M70 assault rifle
FN Minimi Para light machine gun
FN MAG general purpose machine gun
FN M2HB QCB heavy machine gun
H&K GMG automatic grenade launcher
PGM Ultima Ratio Commando I sniper rifle
PGM Mini Hecate sniper rifle
PGM Hécate II sniper rifle
RGW 90 anti-tank weapon

Vehicles

BOV-M
Valuk
HMMWV

External links

Military units and formations of Slovenia